Tanikawa is a Japanese surname. Notable people with the surname include:

, Japanese shogi player
, Japanese cyclist
, Japanese combat sports promoter
, Japanese poet and translator
, Japanese swimmer
, Japanese philosopher
, Japanese footballer

See also
10117 Tanikawa, a main-belt asteroid
Tanikawa Station, a railway station in Tamba, Hyōgo Prefecture, Japan
Tanigawa

Japanese-language surnames